Přibyslav is a town in Havlíčkův Brod District in the Vysočina Region of the Czech Republic. It has about 4,000 people. The historic town centre is well preserved and is protected by law as an urban monument zone.

Administrative parts
Villages Česká Jablonná, Dobrá, Dolní Jablonná, Hřiště, Poříčí, Ronov nad Sázavou and Utín are administrative parts of Přibyslav.

Geography
It lies in the Upper Sázava Hills. The town is situated on the right bank of the Sázava River. There are several fish ponds in the municipal territory.

History
The first written mention of Přibyslav is from 1257. Until the Hussite Wars, it was a small mining town known for silver mining. After the wars, the mining was never successfully renewed. During the Hussite Wars, Přibyslav was a military base of the Hussites. The town was often severely affected by wars and by frequent fires, which destroyed many historically valuable buildings. The most devastating fire occurred in 1767.

Climate

Sights

The oldest building in the town is a Gothic tower from 1497. The adjacent baroque Church of the Nativity of Saint John the Baptist is from 1753.

Přibyslav Castle was built in 1560 by Zachariáš of Hradec. There are two courtyards in the castle. The older one is valuable by columns in the Tuscan style. Today the castle houses the Fireman Museum.

An equestrian statue of Jan Žižka by Bohumil Kafka from 1935 is located in the town park. It is a smaller model of the larger statue, which is part of the National Monument at Vítkov in Prague.

Notable people
Jan Otto (1841–1916), publisher and bookseller
Jan Filip (1911–1971), priest, writer and Esperantist
Jan Bechyně (1920–1973), entomologist
Hana Orgoníková (1946–2014), politician

Twin towns – sister cities

Přibyslav is twinned with:
 Mook en Middelaar, Netherlands
 Sliač, Slovakia

References

External links

Cities and towns in the Czech Republic
Populated places in Havlíčkův Brod District